On August 21, 1883, a devastating tornado affected southeastern portions—the Driftless Area—of the U.S. state of Minnesota. The massive tornado, retrospectively estimated to have been an F5 on the modern Fujita scale, caused at least 37 deaths and over 200 injuries. The tornado was part of a tornado family, a series of tornadoes produced by a supercell, that included at least two significant tornadoes across Southeast Minnesota on August 21. A third significant tornado occurred two hours before the main event hit Rochester. The Rochester tornado indirectly led to the formation of Saint Mary's Hospital, now part of the Mayo Clinic. The tornado closely followed destructive tornadoes a month earlier in the same area: on July 21, two significant, deadly tornadoes hit the area, including an F4 tornado family that killed four people in Dodge and Olmsted Counties, especially near Dodge Center.

Meteorological synopsis

On the morning of August 21, a mid-latitude, deepening low-pressure center moved east-northeastward toward Minnesota, crossing the state during the afternoon and evening. The following morning, the cyclone had already deepened to at most , suggesting a robust system on the preceding day. At the time, surface weather data from the Upper Mississippi Valley were sparse, but nearby observations in the afternoon indicated high temperatures in the middle 80s to low 90s °F. Eyewitnesses reported very humid conditions, indicating ample moisture for thunderstorms to develop. As author Joseph Leonard mentioned in the History of Olmsted County, Minnesota,

 

Although meteorology in 1883 was primitive compared with modern science, Leonard's observations and other weather reports reveal quite a bit about the atmospheric conditions in Southeastern Minnesota on August 21. High temperatures, sufficient humidity, strong surface winds, and vertical wind shear appear to have all been present—all of which are key factors in the development of tornadoes.

Storm development and track

By 4:00 p.m. CDT (21:00 UTC), light rain began falling over the area, and at 4:30 p.m. The tornado killed two people, injured ten others, and damaged at least four farmsteads, one of which it destroyed. After the passage of the storm, conditions briefly improved. At about 6:00 p.m. CDT (23:00 UTC), residents of Rochester noticed a "low bank of cloud"—a thunderstorm—southwest of the city. Few residents were alarmed, but the storm rapidly grew in size and intensity as time passed.

The Rochester tornado first touched down at about 6:30 p.m. The tornado damaged farmsteads in Westfield, Hayfield, Ashland, Vernon, and Canisteo townships. In all, the tornado passed through 40 farms across Dodge County, at least 10 of which it razed, killing five or more people.

As it entered Olmsted County, the tornado obliterated farmhouses, outbuildings, and machinery in Salem Township, causing one death. The tornado continued to destroy structures on farms in Kalmar, Cascade, and Rochester townships before entering the city of Rochester itself. Heavy rainfall preceded the tornado.

Just after 7:00 p.m. CDT (00:00 UTC), skies in Rochester assumed a greenish tint, and a rumbling sound became audible. The "roar" of the tornado gave many residents advance warning. "Dense darkness" enveloped the city as the tornado struck. In just five minutes, the tornado passed through the north side of Rochester, causing devastating damage. The northern third of Rochester was devastated, with 135 homes destroyed and 200 damaged. The tornado also caused extensive damage to a  swath that extended  eastward from Rochester.

At 9:30 p.m. CDT (02:00 UTC), a final tornado, posthumously rated F3, killed one person and injured 19 others near St. Charles and Lewiston in Winona County.

Impact, aftermath, and recovery
The city of Rochester did not have a place to treat the injured from this tornado, as all but three of Minnesota's hospitals were located in Minneapolis–Saint Paul at that time, and none of the remainder was sited near Rochester. Following the tornado, a dance hall in Rochester, Rommel Hall, served as a makeshift emergency room. Local doctors assumed responsibility for the patients' wellbeing under the direction of Rochester Mayor Samuel Whitten; Mother Mary Alfred Moes of the Sisters of St. Francis cared for the patients. Subsequently, the Sisters of St. Francis established St. Mary's Hospital, which ultimately yielded the Mayo Clinic and later the Tornado Guild, the latter of which was dedicated to tornado preparedness.

See also
Climate of Minnesota
List of F5 and EF5 tornadoes
Lists of tornadoes and tornado outbreaks
List of North American tornadoes and tornado outbreaks

Notes

References

F5 tornadoes
Rochester, Minnesota
Tornadoes of 1883
Tornadoes in Minnesota
1883 in Minnesota
1883 natural disasters in the United States
August 1883 events